Simo Johannes Valakari (born 28 April 1973) is a Finnish football coach and former player. He is currently the head coach of FK Auda.

Career
Valakari began his career with KontU in the Finnish lower divisions, before first moving to FinnPa in 1995 and then to Scottish club Motherwell in 1996. After four seasons in Scotland, he was off to Derby County in the English Premiership.

Valakari failed to become a first team regular at Pride Park Stadium and decided to join Dallas Burn for the 2004 MLS season and finished the year with a goal and four assists. Following the 2006 season, his contract was not renewed with the team, known by that time as FC Dallas.

Valakari decided to return to Finland for the 2007 Veikkausliiga season, where he signed for TPS managed by Mixu Paatelainen. He retired from playing in 2009 after several injuries.

International career
Valakari was a regular with the Finnish national team during his stay in Europe. He made a total of 32 caps for his country.

Coaching career
Valakari was named manager of Åbo IFK in January 2010 and subsequently ended his playing career. He however returned "home" as he announced his return to Käpylän Pallo as a youth coach after the 2010 season.

In 2012, Valakari joined SJK as the head coach. In 2013, he managed the team to gain promotion to the Veikkausliiga and they went on to win the Finnish championship in 2015. The team also won the Finnish League Cup in 2014.

After working as assistant manager for the Finnish national team after being fired from the SJK job, he was appointed head coach of Norwegian side Tromsø IL in June 2017. In 2018, his contract was extended until 2022, but he was fired after a relegation in 2019.

In November 2020, Valakari was appointed as the head coach of KuPS until he lost his motivation for the job after the season of 2022 and was released cause he did not work as required.

Personal life
Valakari's sons Onni and Paavo are also footballers.

References

1973 births
Living people
Footballers from Helsinki
Finnish footballers
Finland international footballers
Motherwell F.C. players
Derby County F.C. players
FC Dallas players
Premier League players
Scottish Football League players
Scottish Premier League players
Turun Palloseura footballers
Finnish expatriate footballers
Expatriate footballers in England
FC Kontu players
Expatriate soccer players in the United States
Expatriate footballers in Scotland
FinnPa players
Major League Soccer players
Major League Soccer All-Stars
Association football midfielders
Käpylän Pallo players
English Football League players
Finnish football managers
Finnish expatriate football managers
Seinäjoen Jalkapallokerho managers
Tromsø IL managers
Expatriate football managers in Norway
Finnish expatriate sportspeople in Norway
Eliteserien managers